František Tokár (25 May 1925 in Veľké Chrašťany – 29 October 1993 in Bratislava) was a male international table tennis player from Czechoslovakia.

Table tennis career
From 1947 to 1957 he won ten medals in singles, doubles, and team events in the World Table Tennis Championships.

The ten World Championship medals included five gold medals; four in the men's team event and one in the doubles with Ivan Andreadis at the 1949 World Table Tennis Championships.

Personal life
He worked at the Slovak Institute of Physical Training in Bratislava, Slovakia.

Hall of Fame
He was inducted into the Hall of Fame of the International Table Tennis Federation in 1995.

See also
 List of table tennis players
 List of World Table Tennis Championships medalists

References

1925 births
1993 deaths
Czechoslovak table tennis players
Slovak male table tennis players
People from Zlaté Moravce District
Sportspeople from the Nitra Region